Gregory Tyler Davis is an American electronic musician who has recorded albums drawing from a wide variety of sources, including guitar, field recording, various world/ethnic/traditional instruments, percussion, and voice, all processed through digital manipulation.

After years of experience in hip-hop groups, jazz combos, free improvisation, and experimental composition, Davis moved toward computer-based music in 1997. At Depaul University in Chicago, he studied classical and jazz guitar alongside composition and jazz studies.

In 1997, he started his own label, Autumn Records, to release his own music and the music of others. Davis moved to Boston in 1999 to pursue a master's degree in composition (which he received in June 2001) while independently immersing himself in the study of electronic music. Since 2001, he has played shows all around the world and released records on a number of different labels.

He has collaborated with Keith Fullerton Whitman, Ben Vida, Sebastien Roux, Chris Weisman, Steven Hess, Jeph Jerman, Akron/Family, Toby Aronson (as Harmonizer), and Zach Wallace (as Sun Circle).
Davis left the city of Chicago for Burlington, Vermont in December 2004, where he has been organizing experimental and creative music events.

He has played live shows around the world with Hrvatski/Keith Fullerton Whitman, The Flying Luttenbachers, Blectum From Blechdom, Loscil, Animal Collective, Ratatat, Jan Jelinek, Sebastien Roux, Leafcutter John, Colleen, Avey Tare & Kria Brekkan, No-Neck Blues Band, The Books, Beach House, Mountains, Bird Show, Fog, Viking Moses, Ariel Pink, Boom Bip, and many more.

Davis has released albums on labels such as Kranky, Ekhein, Room40, Install, Home Normal, Digitalis, Carpark Records, as well on his own Autumn Records.

In October 2017 Davis opened a record store in Winooski, Vermont under the name of his record label.

Discography
Clouds As Edges 7" (Grounded, 2001)
Arbor CD / LP (Carpark, 2002)
Greg Davis & Don Mennerich Split 7" (Autumn, 2002)
Precursors 7" (Melektronikk, 2003)
Mort Aux Vaches - Live CD (Staalplaat, 2003)
Curling Pond Woods CD / LP (Carpark, 2004)
Gather / Scatter 7" (Tonschacht, 2004)
Somnia (Kranky, 2004)
Diaphanous LP (Lux Nigra, 2004)
Yearlong with Keith Fullerton Whitman (Carpark, 2005)
Decisions with Steven Hess (Longbox, 2005)
Paquet Surprise with Sebastien Roux (Carpark, 2005)
Ku with Jeph Jerman (Room40, 2006)
Greg Davis & Of Split 7" (Ache, 2006)
Sun Circle CDR (Lichen, 2007)
New Primes (greyfade, 2022)

References

External links 

Greg Davis at Archive.org's Live Music Archive
Greg Davis at Soundcloud

Living people
American electronic musicians
1975 births
DePaul University alumni